A  is a type of litter used as a means of human transportation by the non-samurai class in feudal Japan and into the Meiji period (1868–1911).

Description and use

A roof of some type covered the top and screens could be used to cover the sides as protection from sun or rain. One man would support the weight of the large overhead pole at each end and walked until he tired and switched with a rested carrier. The  should not be confused with the more elaborate , which were used by the samurai class and wealthy individuals.

References

External links
 

Human-powered vehicles
Japanese culture
Japanese words and phrases
Vehicles of Japan